George FitzGerald or Fitzgerald may refer to:
George FitzGerald (musician), English electronic musician
George FitzGerald, 16th Earl of Kildare (1612–1660)
George Fitzgerald (Family Affairs), a fictional character
George Fitzgerald (politician) (1843–1917), merchant and politician in colonial Tasmania, Australia
George Francis FitzGerald (1851–1901), Irish physicist
George Robert FitzGerald (died 1786), Irish eccentric
Sir George FitzGerald, 23rd Knight of Kerry (1917–2001), baronet, hereditary knight and British soldier